The 11401 / 11402 Nandigram Express is an express train belonging to Indian Railways that runs between Mumbai Chhatrapati Shivaji Maharaj Terminus and  in India.

It operates as train number 11401 from Mumbai Chhatrapati Shivaji Maharaj Terminus to Nagpur Junction and as train number 11402 in the reverse direction.

Coaches

The 11401/11402 Nandigram Express presently has 1 AC 1st Class cum AC 2 tier, 1 AC 2 cum AC 3 tier, 2 AC 3 tier, 10 Sleeper class & 3 General Unreserved coaches 2 Guard cum Brake van. There is no pantry car attached but vendors are available.

As with most train services in India, coach composition may be amended at the discretion of Indian Railways depending on demand.

Service

The 11401/11402 Nandigram Express covers the distance of 1139 kilometres in 23 hours 40 mins in both directions.

Traction

It is hauled by a dual-traction WCAM-2/2P or WCAM locomotive until  after which a Pune or Guntakal-based WDM-3A or WDM-3D locomotive takes over until Nagpur Junction.

Timetable

 11401 Nandigram Express leaves Mumbai CSMT every day at 16:35 hrs IST and reaches Nagpur Junction at 16:15 hrs IST the next day.
 11402 Nandigram Express leaves Nagpur Junction every day at 06:00 hrs IST and reaches Mumbai CSMT at 05:40 hrs IST the next day.

Gallery

External links
 http://www.indianrail.gov.in
 https://web.archive.org/web/20070303131207/http://www.irctc.co.in/
 http://www.irfca.org

References 

Named passenger trains of India
Rail transport in Maharashtra
Transport in Nagpur
Transport in Telangana
Express trains in India